José Luis Rojas Ramos (born 5 April 1992 in Junín) is a Peruvian long-distance runner. He won two medals at the 2018 Ibero-American Championships, in addition to a silver won at the 2013 South American Championships.

International competitions

Personal bests
Outdoor
1500 metres – 4:00.3 (Lima 2012)
3000 metres – 8:04.00 (Trujillo 2018)
5000 metres – 13:38.6 (Lima 2018)
10,000 metres – 29:16.15 (Lima 2016)
10 kilometres – 30:14 (Lima 2017)
Half marathon – 1:05:40 (Lima 2014)

References

1992 births
Living people
Peruvian male long-distance runners
Athletes (track and field) at the 2019 Pan American Games
Pan American Games competitors for Peru
Ibero-American Championships in Athletics winners